Mardai is an abandoned uranium mining town located in the Dornod aimag of Mongolia, in a remote area north of Choibolsan.

The Dornod area was prospected for uranium ore by the Soviet Union beginning in the late 1940s. In 1972, a Soviet geological expedition discovered significant uranium reserves and in 1988 the Erdes Mining Enterprise began operation. Mardai was a "secret city" that housed the mine's Russian engineers and technical staff. Mining stopped in 1993 following the fall of the Soviet Union and Mardai, which had housed about 10,000 Soviet personnel, was completely abandoned. Local Mongolian people then scavenged the city for building materials, leaving behind a ruined ghost town.

References

External links
Ураны төлөөх уралдаан ба уралцаан
Cows roam where people once lived
12 Uranium licenses to be cancelled

Ghost towns in Asia